SV Bergisch Gladbach 09 is a German association football club from the city of Bergisch Gladbach in North Rhine-Westphalia.

History 
The club was established in 1909 as Fußball Club Bergisch Gladbach and was joined that same year by the membership of FC Montania Bergisch-Gladbach. On 22 January 1919, FC merged with Turn- und Sportverein der Firma J. W. Zanders Bergisch Gladbach to form Sport-Verein Bergisch Gladbach. This club merged with VfL Gronau in 1936. The team emerged from lower-tier play into the Landesliga Rheinbezirk in 1948, and in the following season, into the 2. Liga-West (II). Following league reorganization in 1952, FC settled into the Amateurliga Mittelrhein (III), where they first took a group title within the division in 1953 before moving on to capture the national amateur final 3:2 over Homberger SV. This led to a first-round DFB-Pokal (German Cup) appearance in 1954, which was followed by additional Amateurliga Mittelrhein group titles in 1955, 1956, and 1958. FC was unable to match its earlier success and the team's performance fell off entering into the 1960s. They played as a lower-table third-division side into the early 1970s.

A 1973 merger with SSG Bergisch Gladbach – itself newly formed out of the union of SV Blau-Weiss 1962 Hand, SV Katterbach, and Sportfreunde Paffrath – failed to improve the club's fortunes, and SSG slipped to lower-level competition. The club has since made sporadic appearances in the Oberliga Nordrhein (IV) (1987–88, 1996–98, 2003–04), most recently returning to fourth-tier play in 2006. In 2007 Bergisch Gladbach decided to drop SSG from its name. The club changed its name again in April 2008 to SV Bergisch Gladbach 09, though it is called Bergisch Gladbach 09 most of the time.

After a number of seasons fluctuating between the Verbandsliga Mittelrhein and the Oberliga Nordrhein, the club won promotion to the NRW-Liga in 2009. When this league was disbanded in 2012, they were admitted to the Regionalliga West, where they lasted for just one season before being relegated to the Mittelrheinliga. They were promoted back to the Regionalliga West as champions in 2019 but were relegated again two years later.

Women's football 
Bergisch Gladbach fielded a very successful women's side that has a record nine national titles to its credit, as well as three Frauen DFB-Pokal wins. Though the club has produced 18 players who played for the German national team, Silvia Neid is by far the most famous former player of the club. The women's football department left the club in 1996 to become part of TuS Köln rrh., which in turn passed their licence to Bayer Leverkusen after the 2007–08 season.

Honours

Men's 
German amateur championship
 Champions (1): 1953
Landesliga Mittelrhein (V)
 Champions (1): 1995
Mittelrheinliga (V)
 Champions (1): 2019
Verbandsliga Mittelrhein
 Champions (3): 1996, 2006, 2009

Women's 
Women's World Invitational Tournament
 Champions (2): 1981, 1984
 Third place (1): 1987
German champions
 Champions (9):  1977, 1979, 1980, 1981, 1982, 1983, 1984, 1988, 1989
DFB-Pokal
 Champions (3): 1981, 1982, 1984

Notes

References

External links 
 
 Das deutsche Fußball-Archiv historical German domestic league tables (in German)

Football clubs in Germany
Football clubs in North Rhine-Westphalia
Bergisch Gladbach
Association football clubs established in 1909
1909 establishments in Germany
Frauen-Bundesliga clubs
SV Bergisch Gladbach 09 players